Xin, King of Hán (died 196 BC), also known as Hán Xin and as Hán Wang Xin, was a descendant of the royal family of the state of Hán during the Warring States period of China. After the establishment of the Han dynasty, Emperor Gaozu granted Hán Xin the title of "King of Hán". In 201 BC, Hán Xin was suspected of conspiring with the Xiongnu to attack the Han Empire and decided to defect to the Xiongnu. He was killed in action during a battle against the Han army in 196 BC.

Biography

Early life
Hán Xin was a grandson of King Xiang of the Hán state of the Warring States period. Around 207 BC, Hán Xin joined Liu Bang's rebel army in Henan and joined him in overthrowing the Qin dynasty. After the fall of the Qin dynasty in 206 BC, Xiang Yu divided the former Qin Empire into the Eighteen Kingdoms and granted Liu Bang the title of "King of Hàn" and relocated him to the remote Ba and Shu regions around present-day Chongqing and Sichuan.

Chu–Han contention

In late 206 BC, Liu Bang led his army out of Bashu to attack the Three Qins. This marked the beginning of a four-year-long power struggle for supremacy over China between Liu Bang and Xiang Yu, historically known as the Chu–Han Contention. At that time, the Hán kingdom was ruled by Zheng Chang, who had been appointed King of Hán by Xiang Yu. Liu Bang promised to help Hán Xin become the King of Hán, and appointed him as a general before sending him to attack Zheng Chang. By the following year, Hán Xin conquered more than ten cities in the Hán kingdom and forced Zheng Chang to surrender. Liu Bang recognised Hán Xin as the new King of Hán. In 204 BC, after Liu Bang was defeated by Xiang Yu at the Battle of Xingyang, Hán Xin was captured by Xiang Yu and forced to surrender. Later, he managed to escape and return to Liu Bang's side.

Hán Xin was reinstated as the King of Hán and became a vassal of the Han dynasty after Liu Bang defeated Xiang Yu in 202 BC and became Emperor of China. He was granted the lands around Yingchuan (in present-day Henan) as his fief and built his capital at Yangzhai (present-day Yuzhou City, Henan).

Flight to Xiongnu
In 201 BC, Liu Bang (Emperor Gaozu) felt that Hán Xin's fief was in a strategic location and was worried that Hán might pose a threat to the Han Empire. Hence, under the pretext of sending him to defend the northern border, the emperor had Hán Xin relocated to Taiyuan Commandery, with Jinyang (present-day Taiyuan, Shanxi) as the new Hán capital. Hán Xin requested to have his capital at Mayi (present-day Shuozhou, Shanxi) instead and the emperor approved.

When the Xiongnu attacked Mayi, Emperor Gaozu suspected Hán Xin of secretly conspiring with the Xiongnu so he sent an imperial edict to Hán Xin to reprimand him. Hán Xin was afraid of being exterminated so he formed an alliance with the Xiongnu against the Han Empire. In late 200 BC, Emperor Gaozu personally led the Han army to attack Hán Xin and forced him to retreat to Xiongnu territory. However, the Han army lost to the Xiongnu at the Battle of Baideng and retreated. Hán Xin and the Xiongnu constantly raided the northern border in the following years.

Death
In 196 BC, Hán Xin allied with the Xiongnu again to attack the Han Empire, and occupied the town of Canhe (possibly the place where a decisive battle occurred 600 years later). Chai Wu, the Han general assigned to fend off the invasion, wrote a letter to Hán Xin, asking him to surrender to the Han Empire. Chai Wu also told Hán Xin that he had a chance of being pardoned since his betrayal was not as serious as others' so the emperor would be more inclined to forgive him. However, Hán Xin refused, claiming he had already committed high treason three times by allying with the Xiongnu on three occasions to attack the Han Empire. He also cited the examples of Fan Li, Wen Zhong and Wu Zixu to imply that Emperor Gaozu would not be as forgiving as Chai Wu claimed.

In the ensuing battle, Chai Wu massacred the population of Canhe and killed Hán Xin.

Descendants
Hán Xin had at least two sons:
 Crown Prince of Hán, name unknown, who followed his father to Xiongnu territory and fathered Hán Ying.
 Hán Tuidang, a younger son who was born in Tuidang in Xiongnu territory.

Both Hán Tuidang and Hán Ying returned to the Han Empire during the reign of Emperor Wen.

There were other more distant descendants of Hán Xin as follows:
 Hán Leng, an official of the early Eastern Han dynasty, was recorded as a descendant through Hán Tuidang.
 Hán Ji, an official of the late Eastern Han dynasty and Cao Wei state, was recorded as a descendant.  
 Hán Mi, a great-great-grandson of Han Ji, was designated as the heir of the Western Jin dynasty official Jia Chong, his maternal grandfather. Drawn into the turmoil of War of the Eight Princes, he was executed in 301 along with his immediate and extended family – both Hán and Jia clan members.
 Hán Yu, the Tang dynasty literary figure recognised for his role in Classical Prose Movement, also traced his ancestry to Hán Tuidang.

References

 
 

196 BC deaths
Han dynasty generals from Henan
Chinese nobility
Chu–Han contention people
Year of birth unknown